Meanwhile may refer to:

Music

Albums
Meanwhile (Camouflage album), 1991
...Meanwhile, a 1992 album by British pop band 10cc
Meanwhile..., a 1995 album by world fusion ensemble Trance Mission
Meanwhile (Gorillaz EP), a 2021 EP by the animated band, Gorillaz

Songs
"Meanwhile" (song), a 1999 song by George Strait
"Meanwhile", a Little River Band song on the 1975 album Little River Band
"Meanwhile", a Moody Blues song on the 1981 album Long Distance Voyager

Other uses
Meanwhile (novel), a 1927 novel by H.G. Wells
Meanwhile (1998 film), a Canadian short suspense film
Meanwhile (2011 film), a film written and directed by Hal Hartley
"Meanwhile" (Futurama), the series finale of the television programme Futurama